"Broken Heart of Gold" is a song by Japanese rock band One Ok Rock. The song was written by vocalist Takahiro Moriuchi and guitarist Toru Yamashita with Nick Long, Dan Lancaster and Masato Hayakawa. It was released as a digital single on May 27, 2021, by Fueled by Ramen, serving as the theme song for the live-action film Rurouni Kenshin: The Beginning.

An acoustic version of the song was released digitally on July 2, 2021.

Track listing
Digital download / streaming
"Broken Heart of Gold" – 4:13
"Broken Heart of Gold (Japanese version)" – 4:13
"Broken Heart of Gold (Acoustic)" – 3:40
"Broken Heart of Gold (Acoustic - Japanese version)" – 3:40

Personnel
Credits adapted from Luxury Disease album liner notes
Takahiro "Taka" Moriuchivocals, songwriting
Toru Yamashitaguitar, songwriting
Ryota Kohamabass
Tomoya Kankidrums
Jamie Muhoberac - keyboards
Nick Longsongwriter
Dan Lancastersongwriting, producer
Masato Hayakawasongwriting
Rob Cavallo - producer
David Campbell - orchestral arrangement
Tom Lord-Alge - mixing engineer
Naoki Itai - Japanese vocals recording, editing

Charts

Weekly charts

Release history

References

External links
 
 

2021 songs
2021 singles
One Ok Rock songs
Songs written by Takahiro Moriuchi
Songs written by Masato Hayakawa
Rock ballads
Fueled by Ramen singles
Japanese film songs